Eric Cross may refer to:
Eric Cross (cinematographer) (1902–2004), English cinematographer
Eric William Blake Cross (1904–1965), Canadian politician
Eric Cross (writer) (1905–1980), Irish writer
 Eric Cross (cricketer) (1896–1985), English cricketer